This is a list of Bengali language films that released in 2020.

January–March

April–June 
Films were not released theatrically from 17 March till end of June due to the COVID-19 pandemic.

July–September

October–December

References

External links 
 

2020 in Indian cinema
2020

Indian Bengali